Parsoft Interactive, or simply Parsoft, was a computer game company known for their series of technically advanced combat flight simulators. The name comes from Eric Parker, founder and chief developer. Their first release was Hellcats Over the Pacific on the Apple Macintosh in 1991, which they followed in 1992 with Missions at Leyte Gulf, an expansion pack. In 1995 they released A-10 Attack! to critical acclaim on the Mac, following that up with A-10 Cuba in 1996. Partnering with Activision, A-10 Cuba was also released as a stand-alone game for Microsoft Windows, and this partnership led to the Windows-only 1999 release of Fighter Squadron: The Screamin' Demons Over Europe (SDoE). The pressure of the SDoE release led to the programmers going their separate ways, and by 2002 the company was dissolved.

References
 "ParSoft Interactive launches new flight simulator", Business Wire, 2 August 1996

Video game companies